Events from the year 1947 in art.

Events
 January 14 – Jackson Pollock's fourth solo exhibition opens in the Daylight Gallery of Peggy Guggenheim's The Art of This Century gallery on Manhattan. Later this year, Guggenheim closes the gallery and Pollock produces the first of his Drip Paintings, the series that brings him international acclaim, in the Springs, East Hampton, New York.
 February 12 – Christian Dior introduces The "New Look" in women's fashion, in Paris.
 October 2 – São Paulo Museum of Art opens to the public in Brazil.
 October – Anthony Blunt takes office as director of the Courtauld Institute of Art in the University of London.
 Journalist Tancrede Marcil Jr. coins the term Les Automatistes in a review of their Montreal exhibition.
 Norman Rockwell produces the first of his Four Seasons calendar illustrations for Brown & Bigelow.
 Lebanese woman painter Saloua Raouda Choucair stages what is perhaps the Arab world's first abstract art exhibition, at the Arab Cultural Gallery in Beirut.
 Béla Hamvas and his wife Katalin write Forradalom a művészetben: Absztrakció és szürrealizmus Magyarországon ("Revolution in Art: Abstraction and Surrealism in Hungary").
 Robert Woods Bliss acquires the Dumbarton Oaks birthing figure.

Awards
 Archibald Prize: William Dargie – Sir Marcus Clark, KBE

Works

 Aristide Berto Cianfarani – Statue of John V. Power
 Paul Delvaux – The Great Sirens
 Sir Russell Drysdale – Sofala
 M. C. Escher
 Another World (woodcut)
 Crystal (mezzotint)
 Up and Down (lithograph)
 Alberto Giacometti
 Man Pointing (sculpture; bronze castings in MoMA, New York, and Tate, England)
 Man Walking (sculpture)
 Hand (sculpture)
 Jean Hélion – A Rebours (Musée National d'Art Moderne, Paris)
 Alfred Janes – Little Cactus
 Louis le Brocquy – Travelling Woman with Newspaper
 Henri Matisse
 Deux fillettes, fond jaune et rouge
 Le Lanceur De Couteaux (cutout)
 Sidney Nolan – The Trial
 José Clemente Orozco – watercolor illustrations for John Steinbeck's The Pearl
 Eduardo Paolozzi – I was a Rich Man's Plaything (collage)
 Bill Traylor – Construction with Figures and Animals
 Andrew Wyeth – Wind from the Sea

Births
 January 9 – Ronnie Landfield, American abstract painter
 January 27 – Cal Schenkel, American painter and illustrator
 February 14 – Ed Hamilton, American sculptor
 March 12 – Kalervo Palsa, Finnish artist (died 1987)
 March 27 – Daphne Todd, English portrait painter
 March 29 – Sarah Charlesworth, American conceptual artist and photographer (died 2013)
 April 7 – Peggy Cooper Cafritz, born Pearl Alice Cooper, African American art collector (died 2018)
 April 17 – Sherrie Levine, American appropriation artist
 April 20 – Vladimír Novák, Czech painter
 June 1 – Anna Hofman-Uddgren, Swedish actress, cabaret singer, music hall and revue artist and theatre and film director
 June 5 – Laurie Anderson, American experimental performance artist and musician
 June 15 – John Hoagland, American photographer (died 1984)
 July 27 - Shalom Tomáš Neuman , Czech born American sculptor and painter
 December – Richard Amsel, American illustrator and graphic designer (died 1985)
 date unknown
 Keith Christiansen, American art historian and curator 
 Louise Lawler, American photographer
 Dona Nelson, American abstract painter

Deaths
 January 14 – MacDonald Gill, English designer (born 1884)
 January 23 – Pierre Bonnard, French painter and printmaker (born 1867)
 March 2 – Stanhope Forbes, English painter of the Newlyn school (born 1857)
 March 19 – Prudence Heward, Canadian painter (born 1896)
 March 25 – Chen Cheng-po, Taiwanese painter (born 1895) (shot)
 April 21 – Gustave Van de Woestijne, Belgian Expressionist painter (born 1881)
 May 25 – Rupert Bunny, Australian painter (born 1864)
 June 9 – Augusto Giacometti, Swiss painter (born 1877)
 June 14 – Albert Marquet, French Fauvist painter (born 1875)
 July 25 – Kathleen Scott (Lady Scott), British sculptor (born 1878)
 August 9 – Seraphima Blonskaya, Russian painter and art teacher (born 1870)
 September 20 – Edward McCartan, American sculptor (born 1879)
 November 3 – Robert Borlase Smart, English painter and critic (born 1881)
 November 8 – Mariano Benlliure, Spanish sculptor (born 1862)
 November 13 – Julian Smith Australian surgeon and photographer (born 1873)
 November 20 – Georg Kolbe, German sculptor (born 1877)
 December 1 – Samuel Courtauld, English art collector (born 1876)
 December 30 – Han van Meegeren, Dutch painter and art forger (born 1889)

See also
 1947 in fine arts of the Soviet Union

References

 
Years of the 20th century in art
1940s in art